Adam Brand may refer to:

Adam Brand (explorer) (before 1692–1746), German merchant and explorer
Adam Brand (musician) (born 1970), Australian country musician
 Adam Brand (album), 1998 debut studio album by Australian country musician Adam Brand